Anstey's Cove is a former hamlet in the "Twillingate district", near Little Bay Islands, Newfoundland and Labrador, Canada.

See also 
 List of ghost towns in Newfoundland and Labrador

Ghost towns in Newfoundland and Labrador